The Eastern Mining and Processing Plant is one of the top ten uranium mining centers in the world, and it is also the largest uranium mining center in Europe. The state-owned enterprise is located in the city of Zhovti Vody, Ukraine.

References 

Companies established in 1951
Steel companies of Ukraine
Companies based in Dnipropetrovsk Oblast
1951 establishments in Ukraine
Uranium mines